Monica Vik Hansen is a Norwegian handball player. She played 29 matches for the national handball team in 1996 and 1997, and participated at the 1997 World Women's Handball Championship in Germany, where the Norwegian team placed second.

References

Year of birth missing (living people)
Living people
Norwegian female handball players
20th-century Norwegian women